Five of a kind may refer to:

 Five of a kind (poker), a type of poker hand
 Five of a Kind, a 1938 American comedy film
 "Five of a Kind" (Roseanne), a 1989 television episode